John Sylvain (June 7, 1924 – August 16, 2011) was a Montreal insurance executive who was named to the Senate of Canada by Brian Mulroney in 1990.

The British born Sylvain had headed United Provinces Insurance Co. Ltd. and served as a director on the Canadian Development Investment Corporation. During the 1988 federal election he was campaign manager for Progressive Conservative cabinet minister Robert Layton in the Montreal-area riding of Lachine—Lac-Saint-Louis.

Sylvain was one of several Senators named by Mulroney in 1990 with the purpose of creating a Progressive Conservative majority in the upper house in order to pass the enactment of the Goods and Services Tax which had been delayed by the Senate's Liberal majority.

He served as deputy chair of the Canadian Senate Standing Committee on Banking, Trade and Commerce.

Sylvain decided to retire early from the Senate and left the body on February 1, 1996, three years before reaching the mandatory retirement age of 75. Sylvain's retirement allowed the Liberals, who were again in government, to regain control of the Senate.

He is the brother in law of financier and Power Corporation of Canada chairman Paul Desmarais, Sr.

References

External links
 

1924 births
2011 deaths
Progressive Conservative Party of Canada senators
Canadian senators from Quebec
Anglophone Quebec people
English emigrants to Canada